Einari Teräsvirta (7 December 1914 – 23 November 1995) was a Finnish gymnast, Olympic Champion and well-known architect (graduated 1939, Helsinki).

He is buried in the Hietaniemi Cemetery in Helsinki.

Olympics
He competed at the 1932 Summer Olympics in Los Angeles where he received a bronze medal in horizontal bar, and a bronze medal in the team competition. He competed at the 1948 Summer Olympics in London where he received a gold medal in team combined exercises.

References

External links

1914 births
1995 deaths
Finnish male artistic gymnasts
Gymnasts at the 1932 Summer Olympics
Gymnasts at the 1936 Summer Olympics
Gymnasts at the 1948 Summer Olympics
Olympic gymnasts of Finland
Olympic gold medalists for Finland
Olympic medalists in gymnastics
Burials at Hietaniemi Cemetery
Medalists at the 1948 Summer Olympics
Medalists at the 1936 Summer Olympics
Medalists at the 1932 Summer Olympics
Olympic bronze medalists for Finland
20th-century Finnish people